Alain-Guillaume Bunyoni (born 23 April 1972) is a Burundian politician who was Prime Minister of Burundi from 23 June 2020 to 7 September 2022. Before that, from 2015 until 2020, he served as Minister of Internal Security in the Cabinet of Burundi.

Background and education
Bunyoni was born on 23 April 1972 in the commune of Kanyosha, in Bujumbura Mairie Province. He was educated at the University of Burundi. He graduated and appeared on the list of graduates in 1994, but he did not attend the ceremony. Instead, he joined the fighting that broke out, following the assassination of President Melchior Ndadaye. He was a member of the Forces for the Defense of Democracy fighting force.

Political career
In 2003, the National Council for the Defense of Democracy – Forces for the Defense of Democracy political coalition reached a ceasefire with the other combatants in the Burundian Civil War. From 2004 until 2005, Bunyoni served as the equivalent of the Inspector General of the new police force. From 2005 until 2007, he served as the Chief of Police of Burundi.

Between 2007 and 2011, Bunyoni served as the Minister of Internal Security, a role he returned to between 2015 until 2020. From 2011 until 2014, Alain-Guillaume Bunyoni was appointed head of the Office of the Minister of Civil Affairs in the Office of the President.

On 23 June 2020, the Parliament of Burundi voted to accept the nomination of Alain-Guillaume Bunyoni, by Évariste Ndayishimiye, the newly elected president, as the 8th prime minister of Burundi. He was sworn into office the same day by the president of Burundi.

Other considerations
In addition to the above responsibilities, Bunyoni was in charge of various international security responsibilities and in 2007 he was one of the United Nations envoys who was in charge of promoting peace and security. He also chaired the East African Police Committees (OCCPAE) Committee on Interpol.

See also
 Parliament of Burundi
 Cabinet of Burundi
 Provinces of Burundi

References

External links

 Post-Nkurunziza Burundi: The Rise of the Generals As at 22 June 2020.

1972 births
Living people
University of Burundi alumni
People from Bujumbura
Prime Ministers of Burundi
Members of the Parliament of Burundi